Adult (stylized as ADULT.) is an American band from Detroit, Michigan, formed in 1998 by married couple Nicola Kuperus and Adam Lee Miller. The band integrates vocals with drum machines, analog synthesizers and electronic/punk elements. Both band members have art degrees. Miller has a painting degree, and Kuperus a photography degree.

History
Before forming Adult, Miller was one half of the band Le Car and released solo material under the name Artificial Material. Adult began releasing albums in 1998 under the pseudonym Plasma Co. Initially, the band members were uncredited and not publicized, but by the time Anxiety Always was released, Adult was listed as husband-and-wife team Adam Lee Miller and Nicola Kuperus. Miller and Kuperus are also the founders of the Ersatz Audio record label. When launching their tour in support of the D.U.M.E. EP, Adult announced that they had become a trio with the addition of guitarist Samuel Consiglio. The trio was short-lived – Consiglio left the band at the start of 2006. While popular in their home city of Detroit, they also enjoy a cult following throughout the rest of the US and are also very popular in Germany and the United Kingdom. They toured with Trans Am in 2002, and in May 2003, the band made its first headlining tour in the United States; gigs across Europe followed soon after. 

Adult have remixed other artists, most notably Felix da Housecat, Fischerspooner, Ladytron, A Number of Names, The Faint, Erase Errata and Bis. Kuperus (who is also responsible for Adult's album artwork and photography) has sung on the recordings of other electronic acts including Death in Vegas, Swayzak and Chicks On Speed. Kuperus has also showcased her photography at museums around the United States and Europe. Between 2008 and 2010, Adult produced the film "thee Three Graces tryptic: Decampment, Traditions & Possession(s)," which was only shown with Adult performing the score live. It was screened at Anthology Film Archives (NY), Detroit Institute of Arts (Detroit), Distrital y Cineteca National: Mexico City Film Festival amongst other theaters.  In 2010, Adult wrote and recorded the original score to the film OPEN by Jake Yuzna.  In 2013, the art museum Mattress Factory in Pittsburgh invited Adult to contribute an installation; the result was called Diptyching which included audio, video, and the re-creation of a life size façade of a house. In conjunction with the piece, Adult released a limited edition 12" Work/Wreck which included the music from the installation.

Adult's eighth studio album, Perception is/as/of Deception, was released in April 2020 on Dais.

Discography

Albums
2001 Resuscitation – Ersatz Audio
2003 Anxiety Always – Ersatz Audio
2005 Gimmie Trouble – Thrill Jockey
2007 Why Bother? – Thrill Jockey
2012 Resuscitation (Vinyl reissue) – Ghostly International
2013 The Way Things Fall – Ghostly International
2017 Live at Third Man – Third Man Records
2017 Detroit House Guests – Mute
2018 This Behavior – Dais
2020 Perception is/as/of Deception – Dais
2022 Becoming Undone - Dais

Singles and EPs
1998 Modern Romantics 12" (as Plasma Co.) – Electrecord
1998 Dispassionate Furniture 12" – Ersatz Audio 
1999 Entertainment 12" – Ersatz Audio
2000 New-Phonies 12" – Clone Records
2000 Nausea 12" – Ersatz Audio
2001 Hand To Phone 12" – Clone Records
2002 Misinterpreted 12" – Ersatz Audio
2002 Limited Edition 7" – Ersatz Audio
2002 Hand To Phone Remixed 12" – Clone Records
2003 Controlled Edition 7" – Ersatz Audio
2004 T & A. 7" – Ersatz Audio
2004 Split/Split/Split 7" – Ersatz Audio/Cass Records
2005 D.U.M.E. 12"/CD – Thrill Jockey
2005 Numbers + ADULT. = This Seven Inch 7" – Kill Rock Stars
2008 The Decampment Trilogy (3 7"s [limited to 100 copies each] with photographic prints taken by Nicola Kuperus) – Ersatz Audio
2008 Let's Feel Bad Together CD-R – Ersatz Audio
2012 Shari Vari / 122 Hours of Fear (covers of songs originally by The Screamers and A Number of Names) – Ghostly International
2013 Work/Wreck 12" – Ersatz Audio
2017 Detroit House Guests: Variations (Digital only) – Mute
2017 Detroit House Guests: The Remixes 12" – Mute
2019 Subsurface/Coming Apart 7" – Dais

Remixes
1998 D.I.E. "The Man You Never See" – Clone Records 
1999 Ganymed "Music Takes Me Higher" – Sabotage Communications
1999 Ectomorph "The Haunting" – Intuit-Solar 
1999 Michiko Kusaki "Let's Rock" – Angelika Köhlermann 
2000 Mat101 "Arcade" – Nature Records 
 2000 Fischerspooner – ("Emerge")
2000 Tuxedomoon "No Tears" – Gigolo Records  
2001 Solvent "Flexidisc" – Suction Records 
2001 Kitbuilders "Girls on Stage" – Vertical Records 
2001 K-Rock "Hardedged Industry" – Breakin' Records 
2001 Solenoid "Narcissistic"- Haio Haio Haio Records 
2001 G.D.Luxxe "I'm Always Busy" – Interdemsional Transmissions 
2001 The Faint "Agenda Suicide" – City Slang/Labels 
2001 Phoenecia "Rhythm Box" – Schematic Music Co. 
2002 A Number of Names "Shari Vari" – Puzzlebox Records
2002 Bobby Conn "Winners" – Thrill Jockey
2002 Jackass & Mule "1-2-3 Miami" – xylpohone jones 
2002 Jolly Music "Radio Jolly" – Illustrious Records / Sony 
2002 Bis "Robotic" – SpinArt Records 
2002 Felix da Housecat featuring Miss Kittin – ("Silver Screen Shower Scene") – City Rockers
2002 Death in Vegas – ("Hands Around My Throat") – BMG International
 2003 Erase Errata "Marathon" – TroubleMan Unlimited
2004 Electronicat "I Wanna Know Now" – Angelika Köhlermann
2008 Ladytron "Runaway" -Nettwerk2008 Tussle "Night of the Hunter" – FrequeNC 
2009 Trisomie21 "Hear Me Now" – Le Maquis
2016 Pet Shop Boys "Shopping" – Moogfest Sampler
2016 John Foxx "The Shadow of His Former Self" – Metamatic Records
2017 Barry Adamson “One Hot Mess“ – Central Control International 
2018 LIARS “Staring at Zero (ADULT. ‘Y Can’t U’ Remix)” – Mute

Contributing vocals from Nicola Kuperus 
2002 Death in Vegas "Hands Around My Throat" – BMG International 
2002 Swayzak "I Dance Alone" – Stud!o K7 
2003 Chicks on Speed "Wordyrappinghood" – ChicksonSpeed Records
2009 Tyrell Corporation "Lose the Hero" – Clone Records

References

External links
 
 Interview with Adam Lee Miller by Alexander Laurence
 Interview by Alexander Laurence (The Portable Infinite)

1998 establishments in Michigan
American musical duos
American synth-pop groups
American techno music groups
American electronic music duos
Electronic music groups from Michigan
Male–female musical duos
Married couples
Musical groups established in 1998
Musical groups from Detroit
Remixers
Thrill Jockey artists
Third Man Records artists
Mute Records artists
Electropunk musical groups
Dais Records artists